The 2018 World of Westgate 200 was the 18th stock car race of the 2018 NASCAR Camping World Truck Series season, the second race of the Round of 8, and the inaugural running of the event. Despite an agreement, Speedway Motorsports would cancel one New Hampshire Motor Speedway weekend and add one race of each national series to Las Vegas Motor Speedway. The race was held on Friday, September 14, 2018 in North Las Vegas, Nevada at Las Vegas Motor Speedway, a 1.5 miles (2.4 km) permanent D-shaped oval racetrack. The race was extended from its scheduled 134 laps to 144 laps due to numerous NASCAR overtime attempts. At race's end, Grant Enfinger would pull away from an ailing Brett Moffitt on the restart and pull away to win his 2nd career NASCAR Camping World Truck Series race and the first and only win of the season. To fill out then podium, Johnny Sauter and Justin Haley, both driving for GMS Racing would finish second and third, respectively.

Background 

Las Vegas Motor Speedway, located in Clark County, Nevada outside the Las Vegas city limits and about 15 miles northeast of the Las Vegas Strip, is a 1,200-acre (490 ha) complex of multiple tracks for motorsports racing. The complex is owned by Speedway Motorsports, Inc., which is headquartered in Charlotte, North Carolina.

Entry list 

*Withdrew.

Practice

First practice 
First practice was held on Thursday, September 13 at 2:05 PST.

Second and final practice 
The second and final practice would take place on Thursday, September 13 at 4:05 PST.

Qualifying 
Qualifying would take place on Friday, September 14 at 3:05 PST. Since Las Vegas Motor Speedway is at least 1.5 miles (2.4 km), the qualifying system was a single car, single lap, two round system where in the first round, everyone would set a time to determine positions 13-32. Then, the fastest 12 qualifiers would move on to the second round to determine positions 1-12.

Three drivers would fail to qualify: Tate Fogleman, J. J. Yeley, and Norm Benning.

Full qualifying results

Race results 
Stage 1 Laps: 30

Stage 2 Laps: 30

Stage 3 Laps: 84

References 

2018 NASCAR Camping World Truck Series
NASCAR races at Las Vegas Motor Speedway
September 2018 sports events in the United States
2018 in sports in Nevada